Temple Hill is a fantasy novel by Drew Karpyshyn, set in the world of the Forgotten Realms, and based on the Dungeons & Dragons role-playing game. It is the second novel in "The Cities" series. It was published in paperback in September 2001.

Plot summary
Lhasha Moonsliver must battle the thieves' guild, the Cult of the Dragon, and other foes.

Reception

References

2001 American novels
Forgotten Realms novels